Hamilton Camp (Born Robin S. Camp,  30 October 1934 – 2 October 2005) was a British-born American singer, songwriter and actor, He is known for his work as a folk singer during the 1960s, and eventually branched out into acting in films and television.

Early life

Camp was born in London and was evacuated during World War II, to the United States as a child with his mother and sister. He became a child actor in films and onstage. He originally performed under the names Robin Camp and Bob Camp, later changing his name to Hamilton after joining the Subud spiritual movement. For a few years, he billed himself as Hamid Hamilton Camp; in this period, he was leader of a group called Skymonters that released an album in 1973 on Elektra. The band consisted of himself (vocals, guitar), Lewis Arquette (vocals, comedy monologues), Lewis Ross (lead guitar), Jakub Ander (bass) and Rusdi Lane (percussionist & mime).

Career
Camp's debut as a folk singer was at the Newport Folk Festival in 1960; and his first recording, with Bob Gibson, was Bob Gibson & Bob Camp at the Gate of Horn, from 1961. Over the next four decades he maintained a dual career as a musician/songwriter and as an actor. Camp is probably best known, however, as the author of the song "Pride of Man", which was recorded by a number of artists, notably Quicksilver Messenger Service, Gram Parsons, and Gordon Lightfoot, who included it as one of three songs by other songwriters on his first record.

An early Gibson & Camp gospel song, "You Can Tell the World" was the opening track on Simon & Garfunkel's first album, Wednesday Morning, 3 A.M. As a singer, Camp had a minor hit with the song "Here's to You," which peaked at number 76 on the Billboard Hot 100 in 1968. In 1969 Camp formed a group called The True Brethren with Waqidi Falicoff (guitar, vocals), Raphael Grinage (cello) and Loren Pickford (flute and saxophone). The four later composed the incidental music for the Broadway show Paul Sills' Story Theatre, which won two Tony awards and was nominated for best show in the 1971 awards.

His voice work as "L" the robot policeman in the 1978 film Starcrash and a role in the 1976 Peter Bogdanovich film Nickelodeon. He also performed with the Chicago comedy troupe The Second City and the San Francisco satirical comedy troupe the Committee and appeared in a number of stage productions, including a 2004 production of A Midsummer Night's Dream at the Hollywood Bowl.

His television work includes a supporting role on He & She, a sitcom starring Richard Benjamin and Paula Prentiss, which ran for one season in 1967–68. He guest-starred on television shows such as The Rat Patrol, The Monkees, M*A*S*H, Soap, The Mary Tyler Moore Show, The Twilight Zone, Starsky and Hutch, Cheers, The Andy Griffith Show, Bewitched, Gomer Pyle, U.S.M.C., Three's Company and Lois & Clark: The New Adventures of Superman, as the older H. G. Wells.  He appeared on two episodes of Star Trek: Deep Space Nine as Leck, a Ferengi and on one episode of Star Trek: Voyager as a Malon freighter pilot.

In 1977, Camp appeared in three episodes of The Feather and Father Gang. In the 1978 opening season of WKRP in Cincinnati, Camp guest-starred in the fifth episode as Del Murdock, owner of Del's Stereo and Sound. He returned to WKRP as Johnny Fever's ex-wife's new fiancé. Also in 1978, he played Warren Beatty's valet, Bentley, in Heaven Can Wait. In 1980, he appeared as a semi-regular on Too Close for Comfort as Arthur Wainwright, the adventurous, youth-oriented boss of Henry Rush, and on the FOX sitcom Titus as Erin Fitzpatrick's alcoholic father, Merritt. He played Bart Furley, brother of Don Knotts' character Ralph Furley, on an episode of Three's Company, "Furley vs. Furley". He also voiced Professor Moriarty in the English dub of the anime series Sherlock Hound.

He was the voice of Fenton Crackshell, aka GizmoDuck, on the Disney animated series DuckTales and its spinoff Darkwing Duck. He played the role of old Malcolm Corley in LucasArts' graphic adventure Full Throttle. He voiced the Prophet of Mercy in the 2004 video game Halo 2.

He became Disney Studio's new voice of Merlin, following the death of Karl Swenson. Camp also voiced for Hanna–Barbera; as Greedy Smurf and Harmony Smurf on The Smurfs series and all of HB's Smurf television specials, Count Dracula in Scooby-Doo and the Reluctant Werewolf, Turk Tarpit in The Jetsons Meet the Flintstones, Mr. Gruber in Paddington Bear, The Grand Dozer on Potsworth & Co., several villains of the week from A Pup Named Scooby-Doo and Barney Rubble as a kid in The Flintstone Kids. Camp's final work was on the film Hard Four in early 2005, as well as a musical album produced by James Lee Stanley called Sweet Joy, completed shortly before his death.

Personal life
He married Rasjadah Lisa Jovita Cisz in 1961, and they had six children. His wife died in 2002.

Death
Camp died of a heart attack on October 2, 2005, four weeks before his 71st birthday. He was survived by his six children and thirteen grandchildren.

Discography
 Bob Gibson and Bob Camp at the Gate of Horn (1961, Rhino)
 Paths of Victory (1964, Collectors' Choice Music)
 Here's to You (1967, Warner Brothers Music)
 Welcome to Hamilton Camp (1967, Warner Brothers Music)
  (1973, Elektra)
 Rumpelstiltskin: A Folktale by Edith H. Tarcov (1973, Scholastic Records)
  (1978, Mountain Railroad Records)
 Mardi's Bard (2003, DJC)
 Sweet Joy (2005, Beachwood)

Filmography

 Bedlam (1946) as Pompey (voice, uncredited)
 Mrs. Mike (1949) as Tommy Howard
 The Happy Years (1950) as Butch Sidney (uncredited)
 Outrage (1950) as Shoeshine Boy
 Dark City (1950) as Bobby – Boy (uncredited)
 Kim (1950) as Thorpe (uncredited)
 When I Grow Up (1951) as Bully
 The Son of Dr. Jekyll (1951) as William Bennett (uncredited)
 Week-End with Father (1951) as Pianist (uncredited)
 My Cousin Rachel (1952) as Philip – Age 15 (uncredited)
 Titanic (1953) as Messenger Boy (uncredited)
 Ride Clear of Diablo (1954) as Andrew O'Mara (uncredited)
 Executive Suite (1954) as Roger Ingoldsby
 The Black Shield of Falworth (1954) as Organ Grinder (uncredited)
 Mardi Gras (1958) as Organ Grinder (uncredited)
 Too Tough to Care (1964) as Otto, a psychologist at a cigarette company
 The Perils of Pauline (1967) as Thorpe
 The Graduate (1967) as Second room clerk (uncredited)
 Cockeyed Cowboys of Calico County (1970) as Mr. George Fowler
 Nickelodeon (1976) as Blacker
 Smokey and the Bandit (1977) as a state trooper.
 American Hot Wax (1978) as Louie Morgan
 Rabbit Test (1978) as Misha
 Heaven Can Wait (1978) as Bentley
 Starcrash (1978) as Elle (English version, voice)
 Roadie (1980) as Grady
 All Night Long (1981) as Buggoms
 SOB (1981) as Mr. Lipschitz
 Too Close For Comfort (1981) as Arthur Wainwright
 Three's Company (1981) as Bart Furley
 The Smurfs (1981–1989) as Greedy Smurf / Harmony Smurf (voice)
 Evilspeak (1981) as Hauptman
 Eating Raoul (1982) as John Peck – Dishonest Wine Buyer
 Safari 3000 (1982) as Feodor
 Young Doctors in Love (1982) as The Others – Oscar Katz
 The Incredible Hulk (1982-1983) as Dr. Brandon Jones (voice)
 Twice Upon a Time (1983) as Greensleeves (voice)
 ABC Weekend Specials (1983) as Sheriff / Little Green Man #1 / Butcher / Villager / Mushroom Harvester (voice)
 Under Fire (1983) as Regis Seydor
 Meatballs Part II (1984) as Col. Bat Jack Hershey
 The Rosebud Beach Hotel (1984) as Matches
 No Small Affair (1984) as Gus Sosnowski
 City Heat (1984) as Garage Attendant
 It Came Upon the Midnight Clear (1984) as Meek Angel
 The New Scooby-Doo Mysteries (1984) as Dracula / Sheldon Keats (voice)
 Sherlock Hound (1984-1985) as Professor Moriarty (voice)
 Pink Panther and Sons (1984) as Additional Voices
 The 13 Ghosts of Scooby-Doo (1985) as Rankor / Ghoulio (voice)
 CBS Storybreak (1985-1988) as Dr. Crabneckel (voice)
 The Flintstone Kids (1986-1988) as Barney Rubble / Flab Slab (voice)
 Foofur (1986-1988) as Additional Voices
 DuckTales (1987-1990) as Fenton Crackshell / Gizmoduck / Man in Soap Opera / Overlord Bulovan / Director / Cop #2 (voice)
 Yogi's Great Escape (1987) as Li'l Brother Bear (voice)
 Scooby-Doo Meets the Boo Brothers (1987) as Ghostly Laugh (voice, uncredited)
 The Jetsons Meet the Flintstones (1987) as Turk Tarpit (voice)
 Rockin' with Judy Jetson (1988, TV movie) as Mr. Microchips / Manny (voice)
 Scooby-Doo and the Ghoul School (1988, TV Movie) as Phantom Father (voice)
 Bird (1988) as Mayor of 52nd Street
 The Completely Mental Misadventures of Ed Grimley (1988) as Additional Voices
 The Flintstone Kids' Just Say No Special (1988) as Barney Rubble (voice)
 A Pup Named Scooby-Doo (1988) as Additional Voices / Mr. Dayton / Samurai Ghost (voice)
 Scooby-Doo and the Reluctant Werewolf (1988, TV Movie) as Dracula (voice)
 Mama's Family (1989) as Dr. Bishop / Purvis (voice)
 Bridesmaids (1989) as Ridgefield
 Arena (1989) as Shorty
 The Further Adventures of SuperTed (1989) as Sparky
 Adventures of the Gummi Bears (1989-1991) as King Jean-Claude (voice)
 Betty Boop's Hollywood Mystery (1989) Maxwell Movieola (voice)
 The Little Mermaid (1989) Additional Voices (voice)
 Paddington Bear (1989-1990) as Mr. Gruber (voice)
 Saved By The Bell (1989) as Mr. Margolies
 Dick Tracy (1990) as Store Clerk
 Chip 'n Dale: Rescue Rangers (1990, TV Series) as Mountie / Chief Beetlebreath (voice)
 Megaville (1990) as Dr. Skutnik
 Midnight Patrol: Adventures in the Dream Zone (1990) as The Grand Dozer (voice)
 TaleSpin (1990-1991) as Babyface Half Nelson / Police Officer / Seymore (voice)
 Tiny Toon Adventures (1990) as The Scottish Flea (voice)
 Gravedale High (1990) as Tucker (voice)
 The New Adventures of Winnie the Pooh (1991) as Grocery store clerk (voice)
 Darkwing Duck (1991) as Gizmoduck / Fenton Crackshell / Jock Newbody (voice)
 Space Cats (1991) as Incidental Characters (voice)
 The Pirates of Dark Water (1991) as Additional Voices (voice)
 Let's Kill All the Lawyers (1992) as Marcus
 Diner (1992) as A-1 (voice)
 Bobby's World (1992) as Uncle Lou (voice)
 The Wattersons (1992-2006, due to the memory of Hamilton Camp) as Hoppity Hooper / Additional Voices (voice)
 Attack of the 50 Ft. Woman (1993) as Prospector Eddie
 Bonkers (1993) as Pitts / TV commercial director (voice)
 Teenage Mutant Ninja Turtles (1993) as Weesel (voice)
 The Tick (1994-1996) as  Professor Chromedome / Benjamin Franklin / Guy with Ears Like Little Raisins (voice)
 Aladdin (1994-1995) as Ayam Aghoul (voice)
 The Pebble and the Penguin (1995) as Megellenic 2 (voice)
 Full Throttle (1995) as Malcolm Corley (voice)
 Gordy (1995) as Father Pig / Richard the Rooster (voice)
 The Twisted Adventures of Felix the Cat (1995-1996) as Voices / Mr. Monster / Mr. Whale 
 All Dogs Go to Heaven 2 (1996) as Chihuahua (voice)
 Lois & Clark: The New Adventures of Superman (1996-1997) as H.G. Wells
 Life with Louie (1997) as Jen Glenn (voice)
 Adventures from the Book of Virtues (1997) as Swindler / The Servant (voice)
 Almost Heroes (1998) as Pratt
 Dr. Dolittle (1998) as Pig (voice)
 Star Trek: Voyager - episode Once Upon a Time (1998)
 Joe Dirt (2001) as Meteor Bert
 The Zeta Project (2001) as Dr. Rashad
 Disney's House of Mouse (2001-2002) as Merlin (voice)
 Wishcraft (2002) as Chief Bates
 Dexter's Laboratory (2002) as Principal (voice)
 The 4th Tenor (2002) as Papa
 Out of Order (2003) as Hamster / Plant (voice)
 Brave: The Search for Spirit Dancer (2005, video game) as Grey Bear (voice)
 The Grim Adventures of Billy and Mandy (2006) as Country Dirt Grome / Man (voice, posthumous release)
 Hard Four (2007) as Bix Karew (final film role, posthumous release)

References

External links

1934 births
2005 deaths
American Subud members
Elektra Records artists
English emigrants to the United States
English folk guitarists
English folk singers
English male child actors
English male guitarists
English male film actors
English male singers
English male voice actors
Hanna-Barbera people
20th-century American guitarists
20th-century American male actors
21st-century American male actors
20th-century American singers
20th-century American male writers
20th-century English male actors
20th-century English male writers
20th-century English singers
20th-century American male singers